"Djibouti" is the national anthem of Djibouti. Adopted upon independence from France in 1977, the lyrics, which are in Somali, were written by Aden Elmi, while the melody was composed by Abdi Robleh.

The anthem was first officially played at an independence ceremony on 27 June 1977.

Music
The melody is written in common 4/4 time. It consists of twenty measures.

Lyrics

See also
History of Djibouti
Flag of Djibouti

Notes

References

External links
Audio of the national anthem of Djibouti, with information and lyrics (archive link)

African anthems
Djiboutian music
National symbols of Djibouti
National anthem compositions in F major